Franco Peppino (born 16 June 1982 in Córdoba) is a retired Argentine footballer, who primarily played as a centre-back. He is currently the assistant manager of Belgrano.

Club career
Peppino began his playing career in 2000 with Belgrano de Córdoba, he made his league debut on 16 December 200 in a 1-4 home defeat to Rosario Central. He went on to make 160 league appearances for the Córdoba club before leaving to join Mexican side CD Veracruz in 2007.

In 2008 Peppino returned to Argentina to play for  Racing Club and in 2009 he joined Arsenal de Sarandí.

Later career
Peppino retired from football at the end of 2020. In May 2021, Peppino appointed assistant coach of newly hired manager Guillermo Farré at Belgrano.

References

External links
 Argentine Primera statistics 
 
 

1982 births
Living people
Footballers from Córdoba, Argentina
Argentine footballers
Association football defenders
Club Atlético Belgrano footballers
Racing Club de Avellaneda footballers
Arsenal de Sarandí footballers
Barcelona S.C. footballers
C.D. Veracruz footballers
Rosario Central footballers
Club Atlético Sarmiento footballers
Gimnasia y Esgrima de Jujuy footballers
Club Atlético Los Andes footballers
Liga MX players
Primera Nacional players
Argentine Primera División players
Ecuadorian Serie A players
Argentine expatriate footballers
Expatriate footballers in Mexico
Expatriate footballers in Ecuador
Argentine expatriate sportspeople in Ecuador
Argentine expatriate sportspeople in Mexico